Colomby-sur-Thaon (literally Colomby on Thaon) is a former commune in the Calvados department in the Normandy region in northwestern France. On 1 January 2016, it was merged into the new commune of Colomby-Anguerny.

Population

See also
Colomby, Manche
Communes of the Calvados department

References

Former communes of Calvados (department)
Calvados communes articles needing translation from French Wikipedia
Populated places disestablished in 2016